Sir Peter Nevile Wake Jennings,  (born 19 August 1934) is a retired British public servant, who served as Serjeant-at-Arms of the House of Commons from 1995 to 1999. Before joining the staff of House of Commons in 1976, he was an officer in the Royal Marines.

Career
Jennings was commissioned into the Royal Marines as a second lieutenant on 1 November 1952. He was made an acting lieutenant on 20 April 1954, and promoted to lieutenant on 1 May 1956 (with seniority in that rank from 1 February 1956). He was made a local lieutenant colonel on 29 June 1974, and relinquished the rank on 1 August 1976. He retired from the Royal Marines on 29 November 1976 with the rank of major.

In 1976, Jennings joined the staff of the House of Commons as a deputy assistant. From 1995 to 1999, he served as the Serjeant-at-Arms, the parliamentary official responsible for order in the House of Commons.

In retirement, Jennings was Chairman of the St Martin-in-the-Fields Almshouse Charity (2004–2010), the Bowles Outdoor Centre (2004–2010), and the English-Speaking Union (2014–2015).

Honours
In the 1999 New Year Honours, Jennings was appointed Commander of the Royal Victorian Order (CVO) in recognition of his service as Serjeant-at-Arms. In the 2000 New Year Honours, he was appointed a Knight Bachelor following his retirement as Serjeant-at-Arms, and therefore granted the title sir.

References

1934 births
Living people
Serjeants-at-Arms of the British House of Commons
Royal Marines Commando officers
Commanders of the Royal Victorian Order
Knights Bachelor